Collesis is a genus of moths in the family Geometridae described by Warren in 1897.

Species
Collesis fleximargo (Warren, 1909) Angola
Collesis mimica Warren, 1897 Democratic Republic of the Congo, Kenya, Malawi, Mozambique, Rwanda, Uganda, Zambia, Zimbabwe

References

Geometrinae